Sauber Motorsport AG is a Swiss motorsport engineering company. After operating it under their own name from  until , Sauber Motorsport AG renamed their Formula One racing team to Alfa Romeo Racing.

Having not won a Grand Prix as an independent, the team was rebranded to BMW Sauber in 2005 and competed as BMW Sauber from 2006 to 2009, finishing third in 2007 and second in 2008 in the Constructors' Championship, and scoring their lone grand prix victory at the 2008 Canadian Grand Prix. At the end of a less successful 2009 season, BMW pulled out of Formula One and the team's future remained uncertain for several months until total control was handed back to Peter Sauber and granted a 2010 entry. Due to issues with the Concorde Agreement, the team remained as "BMW Sauber" for the 2010 season: In March 2010, Peter Sauber announced plans to change the team name but the FIA announced that they would have to wait until the end of the season. At the beginning of the  season, the team dropped BMW from their name.

Until mid-2016, Peter Sauber held a controlling 66.6% stake in the team, with the remainder belonging to then CEO Monisha Kaltenborn; she had been a leading figure in the team since BMW's withdrawal. The team was sold during the 2016 season to Swiss investment firm Longbow Finance S.A, with Pascal Picci taking over Peter Sauber's role as chairman of the board and president.

Sauber is set to be the factory team for Audi for the 2026 season onwards.

Sports cars
Peter Sauber began building sports cars in the 1970s. After using turbocharged Mercedes V8 engines in the 1980s, his team became the official factory team of Mercedes-Benz, reviving the Silver Arrow legend. They won the 24 hours of Le Mans and the World Sports Prototype Championship (1989 and 1990 respectively), competing against Jaguar and Porsche. Among others, drivers such as Michael Schumacher, Karl Wendlinger, Heinz-Harald Frentzen, Jochen Mass, Jean-Louis Schlesser and Mauro Baldi raced for Sauber.

Sauber participated in a number of other racing series before its involvement in Formula One, including the Swiss Sportscar Championship and the World Sportscar Championship. The first Sauber car, C1, was built in 1970. Sauber, in partnership with Mercedes, won the Le Mans 24-hour race in 1989 and the World Sports Prototype Championship in 1989 and 1990 with the Sauber C9 and Mercedes-Benz C11 respectively.

Sauber also built a Group 5 version of the BMW M1.

Formula One

Sauber (1993–2005)

Beginning and partnership with Mercedes-Benz (1993–1994)

The first 'turbo era' of Formula One ended with the  season. The 1.5-litre turbocharged engines were phased out in favour of naturally aspirated 3.5-litre engines. Massive demand for engine suppliers and a constant influx of new teams saw car manufacturers like Subaru, Porsche and Lamborghini enter Formula One as engine suppliers and sometimes buying out existing teams. Other projects never progressed beyond design studies, such as one carried out by Simtek for BMW. It was a turbulent time that led to the withdrawal of many small teams and even more famous marques such as Brabham and Lotus.

A planned Mercedes collaboration with Sauber to enter their own Formula One team was shelved, although behind closed doors Mercedes continued to fund Sauber's Formula One project. The team was to be powered by V10 Ilmor engines in a chassis dubbed the C12, a continuation of Sauber's naming policy from sports car construction (the 'C' was a reference to Peter Sauber's wife Christine). It was to be driven by JJ Lehto and Karl Wendlinger.

The car was soon turning heads not only for its sharp FW14-like lines and striking black livery but its impressive performance, claiming fifth place (two points under the scoring system at the time) on its Grand Prix debut. Despite this impressive entrance to the Grand Prix scene, over the remainder of the season the team rarely saw the finish line due to unreliability and racing accidents. However, they proved their form was not a flash in the pan recording a slow stream of points finishes and rarely finishing outside the top ten when they actually completed a race distance. Despite not achieving a podium, they ended the season with twelve points, seventh out of the thirteen original entries.

The team went into the 1994 season as Sauber Mercedes, now officially Mercedes's factory-backed team with a new car in the Sauber C13 and the Ilmor engine rebadged the Mercedes 3.5 V10. New team Pacific Grand Prix Ltd took a customer supply of more dated Ilmor units. Between seasons Lehto had signed to Mild Seven Benetton Ford. Former Sauber sports car driver Heinz-Harald Frentzen took up the role as Karl Wendlinger's teammate.

Early signs showed the team was, rather disappointingly, delivering similar performances to the previous year, scoring a small tally of points in the opening rounds. The season took a turn for the worse after a fourth place by Wendlinger following the tragic deaths of Ayrton Senna and Roland Ratzenberger at the San Marino Grand Prix. Just two weeks later, Wendlinger was seriously injured after crashing in practice for the Monaco Grand Prix; losing control of his car under braking for the Nouvelle Chicane. He suffered serious head injuries which left him in a coma for weeks and he was sidelined for the rest of the season. He was replaced by Andrea de Cesaris and a returning Lehto who had been replaced at Benetton after injury complications.

The Wendlinger accident was a pivotal moment in Formula One history. Together with the death of Ayrton Senna, it later prompted the mandatory implementation of head protection for drivers in the form of high cockpit sides. Sauber voluntarily pioneered prototypes of these to protect their drivers.

They would finish the season with the same points tally as the previous year but finished only eighth out of the fourteen original entrants. Mercedes was dissatisfied with the progress and left the team at the end of the year, enticed by an offer from the McLaren team which was still looking for a new works deal since Honda withdrew from the sport and an also-disappointing partnership with Peugeot (whose engines went to Jordan). The partnership would see Team McLaren Mercedes take their first win in 1997 and both titles in 1998 but left Sauber to pick up the works Ford engine deal from Benetton.

Red Bull alliance and Ford engines (1995–1996)

The 1995 season and Sauber C14 marked the beginning of a ten-year sponsorship deal with energy drink giant Red Bull. Entrepreneur Dietrich Mateschitz had purchased a majority share in the team and Fritz Kaiser joined as commercial director. They landed a factory supply of Ford ECA Zetec-R V8 engines. The 1995 season saw the return of Karl Wendlinger partnering Heinz-Harald Frentzen. Unfortunately, the Austrian's serious accident in 1994 seemed to have taken a lot out of his driving potential and he was replaced after two races by rookie Jean-Christophe Boullion.

The season, for Frentzen at least, went surprisingly well. The team finished with a record eighteen points despite the underperforming Ford engine and Jean-Christophe Boullion, who was again dropped, allowing Wendlinger to make his final Formula One appearance. They also climbed back up to seventh in the Constructors' Championship.

1995 also saw Petronas become Sauber's presenting sponsor. They renewed their association in 2006, by which time the team had changed ownership.

1996 saw Sauber's worst Formula One season in terms of points despite a promising driver line-up in Heinz-Harald Frentzen and Johnny Herbert, a revised C15 and the new V10 Cosworth JD engine. Despite again holding seventh spot on a shrinking list of constructors, they only scored 11 points and had not impressed for much of the season. For the next season they announced a customer deal to receive Ferrari V10 engines while they worked with new sponsors Petronas to construct their own engines. Unfortunately, due to a major economic crash in Asia the engines were never completed.

Sauber-Petronas Engineering (1997–2005)

Sauber used Ferrari designed customer engines (from 1997 to 2005) and gearboxes built by Sauber Petronas Engineering, a company founded for the sole purpose of building these engines, that were nearly identical to the ones used by Ferrari as Sauber was relegated to being a customer team after four years as an independent works partner team. Sauber licensed nearly every legally licensable part from Ferrari and even had several Ferrari engineers on staff. Many pointed out suspicious similarities between Ferrari and Sauber chassis, but no formal accusations were ever made (FIA rules required each team to design their own chassis).

In 2001, Sauber brought a virtually unknown and very inexperienced Kimi Räikkönen into Formula One, despite the protests of a few drivers and influential members of the FIA, including Max Mosley, that he would pose a danger to other drivers. His performances that year, however, more than vindicated their decision (he would later go on to win the 2007 Drivers' Championship with Ferrari). It also caused Red Bull to sell their majority share in the team to Credit Suisse in protest (Red Bull wanted Enrique Bernoldi to take the seat but he wound up at Arrows). In 2004, Sauber spent a large sum of money on a new wind tunnel at Hinwil, and a high performance supercomputer (called Albert) to help refine the aerodynamics of their cars. The state-of-the-art infrastructure Sauber has built up is one aspect that attracted BMW Motorsport to Sauber.

In its later years, Sauber's links with Ferrari became weaker. They sided with the non-Ferrari teams over planned rule changes at the end of the 2004 season and also joined up with the GPWC. Then they decided to switch to Michelin tyres, while Ferrari continued to use Bridgestone tyres. Meanwhile, beverage company Red Bull left Sauber in 2005 as they bought their own team, Red Bull Racing. BMW ownership commenced from 1 January 2006 with BMW having bought Credit Suisse's share in the team. Sauber's final Grand Prix before BMW takeover was the 2005 Chinese Grand Prix, with Massa scoring a welcome sixth place to round off the team's history. Sauber had finished its independent run in F1 with six third places and two front-row starts being their best results. Amongst notable Sauber drivers were Jean Alesi, 2008 Drivers' Championship runner-up Felipe Massa, Johnny Herbert, and 1997 World Champion Jacques Villeneuve. Two former Sauber drivers drove for the new BMW Sauber team in 2006: Nick Heidfeld who was a Sauber driver from 2001 to 2003, and Villeneuve who drove for the team in 2005.

BMW factory team (2006–2009)

At the end of the  season, the team's majority shareholding previously owned by Credit Suisse was bought by BMW, with Peter Sauber retaining a 20% stake, and was renamed BMW Sauber. BMW sold its part back to Peter Sauber after the end of the  season, but the team formally used the name BMW Sauber until the end of the  season.

2006
For the  season the team re-signed Nick Heidfeld from Williams to be their lead driver (Heidfeld drove for Sauber in 2001–2003), while 1997 World Champion Jacques Villeneuve had his existing Sauber contract confirmed. Pole Robert Kubica was signed as the team's third driver. The team continued to use Sauber's facilities, mostly for chassis construction and wind tunnel testing, while BMW's headquarters in Munich were responsible for building the new P86 V8 engine.

Former Sauber title sponsor Petronas renewed their contract with the new team after BMW Sauber snubbed BP-Castrol, despite them being BMW's official commercial gasoline and motor oil partner. Credit Suisse also continued their sponsorship. For the new season BMW Sauber announced a technical partnership with Intel and O2, claiming that it will eventually lead to technological improvements available on BMW road cars.

The new livery, unveiled in Valencia on 17 January 2006, was the traditional BMW M blue and white with red flashes.

Jacques Villeneuve scored the team's first points with a seventh-place finish at the 2006 Malaysian Grand Prix, after Heidfeld retired from fifth with an engine failure late in the race. Over the first two-thirds of the season the drivers picked up points with a succession of seventh- and eighth-place finishes.

The team ran a radical "twin towers" aero enhancement on the front of the car for the race in Magny-Cours, France, which was meant to direct airflow to the rear and thus improve performance. This unconventional add-on was promptly banned by the FIA as it was adjudged to impede the drivers' vision and thus compromise safety.

Heidfeld scored the team's first podium at the 2006 Hungarian Grand Prix from tenth on the grid. Kubica stood in for Villeneuve, BMW stating that Villeneuve could not drive due to medical complications following his accident at the German Grand Prix. Kubica finished seventh, although he was later disqualified for an underweight car. After the Hungarian Grand Prix, BMW announced that Kubica would complete the season for the Swiss team, spelling the end of former world champion Villeneuve's F1 career.

Kubica scored BMW Sauber's second podium of the season at the Italian Grand Prix, after running in third place for most of the race and leading briefly during the first round of pit stops. Heidfeld struggled in the race and barely earned a point by finishing eighth. The team's fifth place in the Constructors' Championship was cemented by Heidfeld's two further points at the 2006 Chinese Grand Prix, and Toyota's early double retirement from the 2006 Brazilian Grand Prix.

2007

On 19 October 2006, it was announced that Robert Kubica would partner Nick Heidfeld for the  season with Sebastian Vettel taking the test and reserve driver role. On 21 December, it was announced that Timo Glock had been signed as the team's second test driver. The team launched their 2007 car, the F1.07, on 16 January 2007.

The new car showed promising form throughout the winter testing, topping the times sheets on occasions. However, team principal Mario Theissen declared some reliability concerns before the season's opening race in Melbourne. Kubica duly retired from fourth place mid-race with gearbox trouble, but Nick Heidfeld proved their pace in winter testing was no fluke as he raced to fourth place. Heidfeld continued this success with two more fourth places in Malaysia and Bahrain respectively. Kubica finished sixth in Bahrain after retiring in Australia and mechanical trouble in Malaysia.

Their performance thus far had been such that many were saying a race win was likely after firmly establishing themselves as the best team behind championship leaders Ferrari and McLaren. Although the perceived performance gap between the two leaders and BMW Sauber was a fair amount, it was still less than that between BMW Sauber and the teams behind them.

The Canadian Grand Prix brought mixed fortunes for the team. While Nick Heidfeld scored a second-place finish, Robert Kubica suffered a huge crash that resulted in a long safety car period. The media was initially told Kubica had broken his leg, but it later emerged that he had escaped with only a sprained ankle and concussion.

Sebastian Vettel took his place in the US Grand Prix, finishing in eighth place and therefore becoming the youngest driver to score a Formula One World Championship point. After the European GP, however, it was announced by Scuderia Toro Rosso that Vettel would take the second driver seat from Scott Speed.

2008

On 21 August 2007, BMW confirmed its driver line-up of Heidfeld and Kubica for the  season.
Their 2008 car, the F1.08 was officially launched in Munich at BMW Welt on 14 January 2008. It made its track debut at Valencia the next day, with Robert Kubica driving.

The BMW Sauber team also introduced a new scheme for the team as a whole, with every individual getting "fit for pole", from the boss to the cleaners, meaning that the team would be in optimum fitness for the 2008 season. Team principal Mario Theissen targeted the team's first Formula 1 victory for 2008.

BMW Sauber started the season well with Kubica narrowly missing out on pole after a mistake in his main qualifying lap in Melbourne. He later retired after being hit by Kazuki Nakajima but Heidfeld finished second. Kubica took second in Malaysia, with Heidfeld in sixth setting the fastest lap of the race. The team's points total of 11 was their largest score up to that time. In Bahrain, Kubica scored his and the team's first ever pole position, beating Felipe Massa by just under three hundredths of a second. The team went on to finish third and fourth in the race, equalling their highest round points total and promoting them to first place in the Constructors' Championship for the first time.

The team also attained a second-place finish in the Monaco Grand Prix with Robert Kubica, beating both Ferraris and only trailing the McLaren of Lewis Hamilton by three seconds.

BMW Sauber's first race victory came in the 2008 Canadian Grand Prix, the team achieving a one-two finish with Robert Kubica's first race win and Nick Heidfeld taking second place. The victory came after Lewis Hamilton collided with Kimi Räikkönen in the pitlane, ending the race for both drivers. Kubica was on a different refuelling strategy from Heidfeld, who also briefly led the race before securing the one-two finish for BMW Sauber in comfortable fashion. This was the first Formula One victory for a BMW engine since the 2004 Brazilian Grand Prix.

After the team's breakthrough win, development was switched to the 2009 season where new regulations come into play. This greatly annoyed Kubica, (who was leading the championship after the Canadian Grand Prix), as he felt they could have had a realistic chance of taking at least one title. The lack of development was reflected with a drop of form throughout the second half of the season, causing BMW to be outpaced by Renault, Toyota and even Toro Rosso (who started the season as one of the slowest teams) by the end of the season. Despite this, Kubica remained with an outside chance of taking the Drivers' Championship until the Chinese Grand Prix, the 17th round out of 18.

2009

In October 2008, the team confirmed that they would stick with Robert Kubica and Nick Heidfeld as their drivers for the  season.

Although BMW Sauber targeted the  season as the year they would challenge for the title, their start to the season was a disappointment. Kubica was in third place in the opening round, when he collided with Vettel while battling for second place and was forced to retire. Heidfeld then secured the team's first podium of the year in Malaysia, but after six races BMW Sauber had collected a mere six points, and occupied eighth place in the Constructors' Championship out of ten teams. A raft of upgrades were set for Turkey, including an improved regenerative braking system (KERS) and a double deck diffuser. While the new diffuser was implemented, the KERS could not be made to fit the new car and both drivers raced without the device. After the qualifying session for the British Grand Prix Mario Theissen announced that the team had decided to halt further development of KERS; of which BMW had been one of the strongest proponents, and focus instead on improving the car's aerodynamics. This left Ferrari and McLaren as the only remaining users of the KERS system. In the European Grand Prix at Valencia, Kubica scored the team's first points since the race in Turkey.

Following a meeting of the BMW board on 28 July, the company held a press conference the following morning in which it confirmed the team's withdrawal from Formula One at the end of 2009. Chairman Dr. Norbert Reithofer described the decision as a strategic one. The Formula One Teams Association released a statement in response pledging its support to help the team remain in F1.

On 15 September 2009, it was announced that BMW Sauber had secured a buyer, Qadbak Investments Limited which turned out to be a shell company. However, Lotus Racing had been given the 13th and final slot in the  season. The team were awarded what was termed a 14th entry, which hinged either on another team dropping out or all the other teams agreeing to allow 28 cars to enter the 2010 Championship.

Sauber (2010–2018)

Independent return with Ferrari engines (2010–2017)

2010
On 27 November 2009, it was announced that Peter Sauber would repurchase the team conditional upon the team receiving a FIA entry for the 2010 season.

On 3 December 2009, the FIA confirmed that Sauber had been granted the entry vacated by Toyota Racing following their withdrawal and would be using Ferrari engines. Peter Sauber had previously announced, on 29 November, that the team's chassis for the 2010 season would be designated Sauber C29, while the Swiss newspaper Blick reported that the team will be called Team Sauber F1. However, in January 2010, Peter Sauber had said that he had not yet applied for a change of name, so therefore they remained for the season as BMW Sauber F1 Team despite zero BMW components. Kamui Kobayashi was announced as their first signed driver for the 2010 season on 17 December 2009. Pedro de la Rosa was signed as Sauber's second driver on 19 January 2010.

Esteban Gutiérrez later joined the team as a reserve driver, and drove during young drivers' testing after the end of the season.

Despite promising pace in winter testing, the team struggled with technical problems in the early rounds of the season, with no points from the first six races. After running a blank livery for the first four races of the 2010 season, the team finally announced a sponsorship deal with the Burger King fast food franchise at the Spanish and European Grands Prix. During frustrations, Peter Sauber admitted that his decision to rescue the team had been emotionally driven, but insisted that it was proper. Finally, in Turkey, Kobayashi finished tenth, collecting the team's first championship point for the season.

After entering the pits during the closing stages of the race to switch tyres, Kobayashi exited the pit in ninth. In the last few laps of the race, Kobayashi overtook the Ferrari of Fernando Alonso and the Toro Rosso of Sébastien Buemi for a seventh-place finish. The impressive drive from Kobayashi received much acclaim and was Sauber's best result of the season to-date. Pedro de la Rosa meanwhile, despite originally crossing the line in tenth position to secure 1 point, was relegated to 12th place after a penalty, stripping away a double points finish.

The second half of the season gave more productive and consistent results; The drives of Kobayashi, Heidfeld and de la Rosa combined earned 44 points, giving the team eighth place in the Constructors' Championship.

2011

The team debuted their 2011 car – the C30 – on 31 January, with testing beginning the following day.

At the start of the season in Australia, both Pérez and Kobayashi were later disqualified due to technical infringements.

For the remainder of the season, the team obtained regular top-10 finishes, and overall finished seventh in the Constructors' Championship.

On 28 July, it was announced that Kobayashi, Pérez and Gutiérrez would all remain in the Sauber setup for the 2012 season.

2012

Kobayashi then started third at the  behind the two Mercedes cars of Nico Rosberg and Michael Schumacher; although Kobayashi finished the race in tenth position, he recorded the fastest lap of the race, his first in Formula One.

After the race, in which Kobayashi equalled his career-best result of fifth, Peter Sauber announced that he had transferred ownership of a third of the team to CEO Monisha Kaltenborn.

After starting in twelfth position, Kobayashi finished fifth, equalling his best result at the time, before a time penalty for Sebastian Vettel pushed him up into fourth, giving him the best result of his career. Meanwhile, after starting down in 17th due to a penalty, Pérez managed to work a great tyre strategy and finished just behind Kobayashi – prior to Vettel's penalty – in sixth position, giving the team a total points haul of 20, their best since splitting with BMW, and giving them a 53-point advantage over Williams for sixth in the Constructors' Championship. At the start of the race, Romain Grosjean caused a spectacular crash taking himself, Pérez, championship leader Fernando Alonso and Lewis Hamilton out of the race. Kobayashi's Sauber was also damaged and he finished the race in 13th place.

2013
On 23 November 2012, it was announced that Nico Hülkenberg, Esteban Gutiérrez and Robin Frijns would make up the team's line-up for the  season; Hülkenberg and Gutiérrez as part of the race team and Frijns as reserve driver. The team's car for the season, the C32, was launched in Hinwil on 2 February 2013. The livery was changed and the car is now grey, similar to the Sauber cars in the early 1990s.

At the Singapore Grand Prix both Hülkenberg and Gutiérrez were in the points, running sixth and seventh respectively due to pitting under the safety car, but as their tyres went away Hülkenberg managed ninth place and Gutiérrez only 12th. Hülkenberg showed some impressive driving in Korea, finishing in fourth place and allowing Sauber to pass Toro Rosso in the standings. The Japanese Grand Prix saw the team's first double points finish of the 2013 season with Hülkenberg sixth after running most of the race in fourth, and Gutiérrez seventh after an impressive battle with Nico Rosberg's Mercedes. Hülkenberg scored again in the last two rounds and Sauber finished seventh in the WCC with 57 points.

2014

However, by the end of 2014, de Silvestro was no longer part of the team. For the  season, Gutiérrez was retained and joined by Adrian Sutil, following Hülkenberg's decision to return to Force India. The team struggled throughout the season, often going out in the first round of qualifying and failing to score a single point for the first time in team history.

2015
On 5 November 2014, Felipe Nasr was announced as a Sauber driver to complete the 2015 line-up. Ferrari Driver Academy member Raffaele Marciello acted as reserve driver. The team also underwent a livery change in accordance to their new sponsor Banco do Brasil.

Driver's contractual dispute
The start of the season saw Sauber become involved in legal action commenced by their 2014 reserve driver, Giedo van der Garde. Sauber breached the contract when the team instead signed Felipe Nasr and Marcus Ericsson as announced in November 2014. Despite the Swiss arbitrator ordering Sauber to "refrain from taking any action the effect of which would be to deprive Mr. van der Garde of his entitlement to participate in the 2015 Formula One season as one of Sauber's two nominated race drivers", further legal action was required to see the award enforced. Just prior to the  held on 13 to 15 March 2015, van der Garde applied to an Australian court who ordered, at first instance on 11 March and on 12 March following Sauber's failed appeal, that he be permitted to race in Melbourne. Due to the risk of having its assets seized for not obeying Court orders, Sauber opted to abort participation in Friday morning's first practice session pending an outcome in contempt of court proceedings against Sauber's team principal, Monisha Kaltenborn.

Based on media speculation, however, thanks to an intervention by Bernie Ecclestone to avoid further negative publicity on the sport, Ericsson and Nasr were able to take part in Friday afternoon's second practice session. The matter was temporarily resolved on Saturday, 14 March 2015, following an announcement by van der Garde that he would forego racing in Melbourne, with a view to finding a more permanent solution in the future. The Sauber team and its new drivers for 2015, Ericsson and Nasr, were thus able to complete the Saturday qualifying session and point-scoring race on the Sunday. Three days later, on 18 March 2015, van der Garde confirmed that he and Sauber had reached, by mutual consent, a settlement that would see him relinquish, once and for all, his rights to race in Formula One with the team in return for compensation in the amount of US$16 million. The controversy, however, continued due to a statement released by van der Garde revealing further background and indicating that his intention had also been that of promoting the rights of racing drivers, whose contracts are often dishonoured. In response, the Sauber team expressed surprise at van der Garde's post-settlement statement opting to not comment further on the matter.

After the resolution of the dispute, Sauber underwent an improvement from the previous year, finishing fifth in the race, their best result all year. They finished the season eighth, ahead of McLaren and Marussia.

2016

Mid 2016 sale to Longbow Finance S.A.
On 20 July 2016 it was announced that Swiss based investment firm Longbow Finance had bought both Peter Sauber and Monisha Kaltenborn's shares in the company, which made Longbow Finance the sole owner of Sauber. Pascal Picci was announced to take Peter Sauber's role as chairman of the board and president. Monisha Kaltenborn remained as Team principal and CEO of Sauber. The acquisition by Longbow Finance followed a series of speculation about the future of Sauber. The team had been in financial trouble for years before the change of ownership, often being unable to pay salaries to team members on time. Longbow's owners are said to include Swedish billionaires Finn Rausing, Stefan Persson and Karl-Johan Persson.

During the season, the team only scored points on one occasion; Felipe Nasr's ninth-placed finish in the  scored two points for the team, who finished tenth in the Constructors' Championship, one point ahead of Manor.

2017

On 16 January 2017, the team announced the signing of Pascal Wehrlein, replacing Nasr. After Wehrlein was injured in a crash at the 2017 Race of Champions, Ferrari third driver Antonio Giovinazzi took his place for the first winter test. Giovinazzi again replaced Wehrlein for the following race in China. Days before the 2017 Azerbaijan Grand Prix, it was confirmed that the first ever female F1 team principal Monisha Kaltenborn would be stepping down from the team. Her role was replaced by former Renault team principal Frédéric Vasseur.

Partnership with Alfa Romeo (2018)

2018

In April 2017, it was confirmed Sauber would end their engine deal with Ferrari and begin a new contract with Honda. However, on 27 July 2017, it was announced that Sauber had cancelled their planned partnership with Honda for 2018 onwards for "strategic reasons". The following day Sauber confirmed their new multi-year agreement with Ferrari for up-to-date engines starting in 2018. On 29 November 2017, Sauber announced that they had signed a multi-year technical and commercial partnership contract with Alfa Romeo, therefore the team was renamed to Alfa Romeo Sauber F1 Team for the 2018 season onwards.On 2 December 2017, it was announced that Charles Leclerc and Marcus Ericsson would be racing for the team in 2018. Tatiana Calderón was promoted to the role of test driver, having been a development driver for the team in 2017.

On 8 April 2018, at the Bahrain Grand Prix, Ericsson placed ninth and picked up 2 points for the team using a 1-stop strategy. Two races later, Leclerc finished sixth in the Azerbaijan Grand Prix which was the team's highest position since the 2015 Australian Grand Prix. The race that followed in Spain saw Leclerc finish in tenth and score back to back points finishing results. It was the first time Sauber finished in the points in back to back races since . Over the course of the season, Sauber would finish in the points on 12 occasions and would get both cars in the points twice.

Prior to the Belgian Grand Prix, Sauber announced a sponsorship deal with Austrian private jet operator GlobeAir.Sauber finished the season with a respectable 48 points finishing in eighth position on the Constructors Table. Following the season's conclusion, Ericsson was not retained for the following season and Leclerc departed for Scuderia Ferrari.

Alfa Romeo Racing/F1 Team (2019–2023)

2019

In September 2018, Sauber confirmed that Kimi Räikkönen would be swapping places with Charles Leclerc for the 2019 season, after Leclerc was announced to race for Ferrari in 2019. Also announced in September 2018 was that Marcus Ericsson would stay with the team, but as third driver and brand ambassador. Antonio Giovinazzi would replace Ericsson and drive alongside Raikkonen for the 2019 season.

On 1 February 2019, Sauber announced that it would compete in the 2019 season as "Alfa Romeo Racing" although the ownership, racing licence and management structure would remain unchanged.

The 2019 season was a good season for Alfa Romeo, they managed to score 57 points and finished P8 in the World Constructors' Championship. Kimi Räikkönen managed 9 point finishes over the 2019 season, with four consecutive top-10 finishes in the first 4 races. Antonio Giovinazzi only managed 4 point finishes over the season.

Highlight of the season for the team came in Brazil, after an action packed race, a collision between Alexander Albon and Lewis Hamilton, saw both Alfa Romeo's promoted into the top 5. Räikkönen finished P4 and Giovinazzi finished P5, securing 22 points for the team and solidifying P8 in the Constructors.

2020

Kimi Räikkönen and Antonio Giovinazzi stayed on for Alfa Romeo, after an impressive 2019 season. Marcus Ericsson decided to focus fully on IndyCar, rather than being Alfa Romeo's reserve driver. He ensured that he will maintain links with Alfa Romeo and Sauber. To replace Ericsson, Alfa Romeo signed Robert Kubica, after he was released by Williams. This also meant that PKN Orlen would become title sponsors of Alfa Romeo. An investigation was launched against Ferrari's power unit and the FIA reached an unknown agreement with Ferrari, Haas and Alfa Romeo. This details of this agreement are unknown, but it was done to hinder the performance of the Ferrari power unit.

The 2020 season was not a good season for Alfa Romeo. While they did manage to retain P8 in the Constructors' Championship, they only managed to get 8 points, 49 points below what they got in 2019. Throughout the season, Kimi Räikkönen managed only two point finishes, with Antonio Giovinazzi getting three. Both drivers ended up with four points and ended in P16 and P17 respectively.

2021
Alfa Romeo retained both Kimi Räikkönen and Antonio Giovinazzi. Robert Kubica also remained as the reserve driver and ahead of the Emilia Romagna Grand Prix, Alfa Romeo confirmed that Callum Ilott would become their test driver. The Ferrari power unit agreement with the FIA had finished, meaning the power unit should be back to normal use.

Alfa Romeo finished ninth in the Constructors' Championship, with 13 points. Räikkönen scored 10 points by finishing in top 10 on four occasions, while Giovinazzi scored twice to collect the remaining three points. Räikkönen tested positive for COVID-19 ahead of the Dutch Grand Prix, forcing him to sit out of the event as well as the Italian Grand Prix a week later. Kubica stood in, finishing 15th and 14th, respectively.

2022
After Räikkönen announced his retirement and the team elected not to retain Giovinazzi, Valtteri Bottas and Guanyu Zhou were signed to race for the team in 2022. Bottas had a best result of fifth at Imola and finished 10th in the overall standings, whereas Zhou scored points in three races and ranked 18th in points.

2023 
Sauber are due to end their relationship with Alfa Romeo at the end of 2023 after deciding not to renew the agreement. On 13 December 2022, Andreas Seidl was announced as Sauber’s new Chief Executive Officer from January 2023, replacing Frédéric Vasseur.

Audi factory team (2026–) 
On 26 October 2022, it was announced that Sauber will compete as the Audi factory team from 2026, using Audi's power unit. In January 2023, Audi announced the acquisition of a minority stake in the Sauber Group.

Sauber Academy

In November 2018, Sauber entered a partnership with Czech team Charouz Racing System to form the Sauber Junior Team, followed by the creation of a karting team in March 2019. In 2020, Sauber relaunched the junior team as Sauber Academy and parted ways with Charouz.

Racing record

Footnotes

References

External links

 
 Sauber team profile on BBC Sport
 Sauber team page on skysports.com

 
Formula One entrants
Swiss auto racing teams
Swiss racecar constructors
24 Hours of Le Mans teams
World Sportscar Championship teams
Swiss brands
Red Bull sports teams
Vehicle manufacturing companies established in 1970
Companies based in the canton of Zürich
German Formula 3 teams
Auto racing teams established in 1970